Jan Greve Thaulow Petersen (October 20, 1887 - March 3, 1967) was a Norwegian archaeologist.

Biography
He was the son of Hans Henrik Petersen (1827–1906) and Elisabeth Cæcilie Thaulow (1845–1901). His father was the principal of Trondheim Cathedral School.  
Petersen became a cand.philos. in history in 1914 at the University of Oslo and the following year was employed as a curator at the University's Antiquities Collection. Petersen received a dr.philos. in archeology during 1919. Petersen was director of the Stavanger Museum from 1923 to 1958.  

During this period he worked with excavation and publication of Iron Age farms in southwestern Norway. He also worked with architect  Gerhard Fischer (1890-1977)  in the preservation and restoration of the medieval monastery  Utstein Abbey.

He was  notable for writing De Norske Vikingsverd ("The Norwegian Viking Swords") in 1919.  This book was the "standard and authoritative work" on Norse sword typology and "remains an invaluable guide today." 

The Oakeshott typology by British historian and illustrator Ewart Oakeshott (1916–2002) was based on Petersen's work.

Personal life
In 1928, he was elected to the Norwegian Academy of Sciences.
In 1917, he married Gerda Holtermann (1892–1985). Their  daughter Liv Petersen (1922–81) married the political scientist Knut Dahl Jacobsen (1925–1999).

Selected works
De Norske Vikingesverd (1919)
Vikingetidens smykker (1928)
 Gamle gårdsanlegg i Rogaland (2 volumes, 1934–1936) 
Vikingetidens redskaper (1951)

References

External links
 Partial online English translation of De Norske Vikingsverd  by Kristin Noer (1998)

Norwegian archaeologists
1887 births
1967 deaths
People from Trondheim
20th-century archaeologists
 University of Oslo alumni
Directors of museums in Norway
Members of the Norwegian Academy of Science and Letters